Byron Ward (born February 11, 1969, in Amsterdam) is a Dutch baseball player who represented the Netherlands at the 1996 Summer Olympics.

References

External links
 

Dutch baseball players
Olympic baseball players of the Netherlands
Baseball players at the 1996 Summer Olympics
Sportspeople from Amsterdam
1969 births
Living people
20th-century Dutch people